Birch Creek is a tributary of the Two Medicine River in Montana in the United States. It rises at the continental divide in the Lewis and Clark National Forest, and flows northeast, through Swift Reservoir. It receives Dupuyer Creek and joins the Two Medicine in northern Pondera County. It forms part of the southern border of the Blackfeet Indian Reservation.

See also

List of rivers of Montana
Montana Stream Access Law

Notes

Rivers of Montana
Bodies of water of Pondera County, Montana